HURN is a four-letter acronym that may refer to:
 Huron Consulting Group (NYSE: HURN)
 Hurn, a village in southeast Dorset, England
RAF Hurn, military base nearby, now
Bournemouth Airport